Binti is a 2019 Belgian drama film written and directed by Frederike Migom. Twelve-year-old Binti was born in the Congo but has lived with her father Jovial in Belgium since she was a baby. Despite not having any legal documents, Binti wants to live a normal life and dreams of becoming a famous vlogger. Elias (11) runs his 'save-the-okapi-club' without the help of his father, who's moved to Brazil following his divorce with Elias's mother. The police raid Binti and Jovial's home, sending the two on the run and Binti into the path of Elias. When their parents meet shortly after, Binti quickly sees the perfect solution to all her problems: if she can match her dad with Elias' mom, they can get married and stay in Belgium.

The film was screened at the 2020 Sundance Film Festival. At the 10th Magritte Awards, Binti received four nominations, including Best Flemish Film , Most Promising Actor for Baloji, Jury award CineKid 2019 and the ECFA award 2020.

Accolades

References

External links
 

2019 films
2019 drama films
Belgian children's films
Belgian drama films
Films about immigration
2010s Dutch-language films